The Cabot Trail Relay Race is an annual 276.33 km (171.70 mi) relay race around Cape Breton's Cabot Trail. The race takes place over 24 hours in 17 stages and features up to 70 teams and 1,200 runners. The race begins and ends in Baddeck, Nova Scotia. The annual event began in 1988, when just 6 teams participated. Since its founding, over 27,000 runners have participated in the event.

Format
The race takes place over approximately 24 hours, beginning on a Saturday morning and continuing to Sunday morning. The race is divided into 17 stages which are unequal both in distance and difficulty. Typically each leg is run by a different runner, but runners can run multiple legs. In 2010 ultramarathoner Mark Campbell attempted to run the entire relay solo, but fell ill and could not complete it.  The race begins at the Gaelic College monument outside of Baddeck and completes the Cabot Trail in a counter-clockwise direction, ending in front of the Baddeck Court House. Although some sections of the race are relatively flat, others ascend mountains including Cape Smokey, North Mountain, and MacKenzie Mountain—climbing as high as 460 meters. Leg 9 of the race, which runs over North Mountain, is generally considered the most difficult leg of the race.

Race Map 
Full Race Map

Entry lottery
The race is limited to just 70 teams. 45 teams are drawn from a hat of registered entrants. Another 25 teams are selected by members of the tech crew and organizing committee. The remaining teams are placed on a wait list. A list of accepted teams is posted in January of the year of the race.

Requirements
Runners must be 18 years of age to participate in the race. Additionally, runners must be able to run a minimum pace of 9:30 per mile. Runners are expected to finish each leg within the time allotted by this pace. Runners who fail to finish a leg within the allotted time are assigned the time of the slowest runner to complete the leg, plus 5 minutes.

Course records

Male

Female

Mixed

Leg records

Male
The top male record holder is Dan Vassallo who holds five leg records. Burtham's leg 9 record, set in 2000, is the longest standing record at the Cabot Trail Relay Race.

Female
The majority of the female records are held by two women. The title of top female record holder is shared by both Sheri Piers (who also has the fastest time run on the longer course used for leg 17 in 2012 and 2013) and her training partner Kristin Barry, with each holding five leg records.

References
Notes

Citations

External links
 Official Site

Long-distance relay races
Cape Breton Island
Sport in Nova Scotia